The 2014–15 Vermont Catamounts women's basketball team will represent the University of Vermont in the America East Conference. The Catamounts were led by fifth year head coach Lori Gear McBride and will once again play their home games in the Patrick Gym. They finished the season 5-24, 2-14 in America East play in a tie for an eighth-place finish. They lost in the quarterfinals of the 2015 America East women's basketball tournament to Albany.

Media
All non-televised home games and conference road games will stream on either ESPN3 or AmericaEast.tv. Select home games will be televised by the Northeast Sports Network. Most road games will stream on the opponents website. All games will be broadcast on WVMT 620 AM and streamed online through SportsJuice.com with Rob Ryan calling the action.

Roster

Schedule

|-
!colspan=12 style="background:#004400; color:#FFC40C;"| Regular season

|-
!colspan=12 style="background:#FFC40C; color:#004400;"| 2015 America East tournament

See also
2014–15 Vermont Catamounts men's basketball team
Vermont Catamounts women's basketball

References

Vermont
Vermont Catamounts women's basketball seasons
2014 in sports in Vermont
2015 in sports in Vermont